The COVID-19 pandemic in Brunei is part of the worldwide pandemic of coronavirus disease 2019 caused by severe acute respiratory syndrome coronavirus 2. The virus spread to Brunei on 9 March 2020, when its first case was confirmed in Tutong. Many early cases were linked to Jamek Mosque Sri Petaling in Kuala Lumpur, which held a large Tablighi Jamaat ijtema event at the end of February 2020. Of Brunei's first 50 cases, 45 were related to Jamek Mosque.  The pandemic had spread to all districts of Brunei.

Background 
On 12 January 2020, the World Health Organization (WHO) confirmed that a novel coronavirus was the cause of a respiratory illness in a cluster of people in Wuhan City, Hubei Province, China, which was reported to the WHO on 31 December 2019. The case fatality ratio for COVID-19 has been much lower than SARS of 2003, but the transmission has been significantly greater, with a significant total death toll.

Timeline

March 2020 
On 9 March 2020, the Ministry of Health confirmed that preliminary coronavirus tests had returned positive for a 53-year-old male who had returned from a tabligh in Kuala Lumpur, Malaysia on 3 March. The patient began to experience symptoms on 7 March, and was eventually moved to the National Isolation Centre in Tutong for treatment. The ministry is following up with the three friends he had travelled with, and with the patient's family members.

On 10 March, the Health Ministry reported five more cases of the coronavirus, bringing the total to six. These five individuals were close contacts of the first case and were isolated for treatment at the National Isolation Centre in Tutong.

On 11 March, the Health Ministry reported five new cases, bringing the total number to 11. Three of these individuals had attended the tabligh in Kuala Lumpur on 3 March.

On 12 March, the Health Ministry confirmed 14 new cases, bringing the total number to 25. Ten of these cases were linked to the same Islamic missionary gathering in Kuala Lumpur that the first confirmed patient had attended. Three of the cases were close contacts of the confirmed patients while the last case was a 64-year-old man who had been to Kuala Lumpur and Cambodia.

On 14 March, the Health Ministry reported that Brunei had a total of 40 cases of the coronavirus.

On 15 March, Brunei confirmed 10 new cases, bringing the total number to 50.

On 22 March, Brunei confirmed 88 cases.

On 23 March, Brunei confirmed 3 new cases, bringing the total number to 91.

On 24 March, the Health Ministry confirmed 13 new cases, the highest since the first case on 9 March, bringing the total number to 104.

On 25 March, Brunei confirmed 109 cases.

On 26 March, Brunei confirmed 114 cases, with 5 recoveries to-date.

On 27 March, Brunei confirmed 115 cases, with 11 recoveries to-date. In the evening, the first case of death occurs.

April 2020

May 2020 
On 5 May, one new COVID-19 case has been confirmed, bringing the total active case to 139. On the next day, 2 related cases were detected involving the case detected on the previous day.

June 2020 
On 2 June, most schools partially reopened and the majority of classes resumed as normal.

July 2020

August 2020 
On 7 August, Brunei reported one imported case after 91 days of zero positive cases. The carrier was a local man travelling from Yemen.

September 2020

October 2020

November 2020 
On 23 November, the Ministry of Health announced that another case had been detected in the country. Case 149 was a woman, aged 37, who arrived in the country on the flight from Kuala Lumpur, BI874, where she transited from India, on 11 November. She was asymptomatic and contact tracing had identified 3 close contacts which tested negative for COVID-19, another close contact was still awaiting their results at the time of the press release.

On 24 November, the Ministry of Health announced that another case had been detected in the country. Case 150 was a man, aged 37, who arrived in the country on the flight from Kuala Lumpur, BI874, where he transited from Egypt, on 13 November. He was asymptomatic and contact tracing had identified 5 close contacts which have all tested negative for COVID-19.

December 2020 
On 1 December, the Ministry of Health announced that another case had been detected in the country. Case 151 was a woman, aged 26, who arrived in the country on the flight from Kuala Lumpur, BI874, where she transited from Nepal, on 20 November. She was asymptomatic and contact tracing had identified 2 close contacts which both tested negative for COVID-19.

On 8 December, the Ministry of Health announced that another case had been detected in the country. Case 152 was a man, aged 39, who arrived in the country on the flight from Kuala Lumpur, BI874, on 27 November. The patient was asymptomatic and contact tracing identified that there were 6 close contacts which had all tested negative for COVID-19.

January 2021 
On 3 January 2021 the Ministry of Health announced that there were 15 new cases that had been detected in the country. All of the infected were males, 19-21 who arrived on a flight from London, BI004, on the 21 December 2020. All of the infected were members of a group of 81 people. Case 165 started developing symptoms on the 31 December 2020, all other cases were asymptomatic.

June 2021 
On 21 June the first shipment of the Moderna COVID-19 vaccine totalling 50,400 doses, out of the 200,000 that was procured by the Ministry of Health, arrived in the country.

August 2021 
On 9 August, Brunei reported its highest daily record of COVID-19 cases in 15 months. 42 new cases brings up the total confirmed cases to 406.

On 11 August, Brunei reported another highest daily record of COVID-19 cases with 54 new cases.

On 20 August, Brunei recorded another death from COVID-19. The deceased, Allahyarham, was 70 years old but his death was categorised as a heart attack and it is claimed that the cause of death was not COVID-19; as such details about the patient will not be revealed to the public and the Ministry implores for the public to not reveal personal details of the deceased. Also on this day Brunei received a donation of 100,000 doses of the Moderna vaccine from Singapore.

On 1 September, the Ministry of Health announced that vaccine rollout would be temporarily paused for members of the public who had not received any doses yet, due to a vaccine shortage in the country. People awaiting their second dose and vulnerable groups, namely: the elderly, pregnant women and disabled people, would be prioritised until the supply situation improves; the next day the Ministry announced that they were currently in negotiations with Singapore in an attempt to perform a vaccine trade with the city-state, however the situation is proving to be difficult as Brunei would also need to apply for approval from the vaccine manufacturers in addition to the government of Singapore.

June 2022 
Brunei has stopped daily reporting of COVID-19 cases in the country, effective 22 June.

Distribution

Reactions
In late January, Brunei announced entry restrictions for people coming from China. Starting February 1, temperature screening was implemented on entry to the country. Royal Brunei Airlines reduced flights to China. In response to the COVID-19 pandemic, the Ministry of Education announced that the first school term break scheduled for 16 March 2020 would be moved forward to 11 March.

On 14 March, the Brunei Ministry of Health ordered 638 people to go into quarantine. The Ministry has also stepped up efforts to track more close contacts of positive cases.

On 15 March, the Bruneian Government barred all citizens and foreign residents from leaving as a result of the COVID-19 pandemic. The Ministry of Health has also banned mass gatherings including weddings and sporting events. In addition the National Football Association of Brunei Darussalam, the Tutong District Amateur Football Association League, and the Brunei Basketball Association suspended all matches and games.

On 16 March, the Ministry of Religious Affairs announced a one-week closure for all mosques in the country, from 17 March until 23 March, and the Friday prayers which coincided with this time were suspended. However, the adhan or Islamic prayer calls would still be conducted. The Bruneian Government also announced that the Temburong Bridge would be opened on the following day, earlier than scheduled, to ease travelling to the Temburong District exclave after the government announced outbound travel ban. Previously, commuters have to drive through the Malaysian Limbang District or take passenger ferry services. At initial opening, the bridge was opened from 6 am to 10 pm and traffic is only allowed for Brunei-registered vehicles.
However, on the first day of opening, citizens were seen flocking to Temburong, taking advantage of the bridge for pleasure purposes. The government then changed the opening time of the bridge to 6am to 6pm as a precautionary measure to reduce the spread of COVID. On 23 May 2020 the opening hours of the bridge were extended back to their original times.

Notes

References

External links 
 Latest Updates on the Coronavirus cases in Brunei – Ministry of Health of Brunei
 CoronaTracker – Statistics on the coronavirus cases in Brunei
 Coronavirus COVID-19 Global Cases and historical data by Johns Hopkins University

 
Brunei
Brunei
COVID-19 pandemic
COVID-19 pandemic
Disease outbreaks in Brunei